Charles Finley may refer to:

Charles Finley (politician) (1865–1941), U.S. Representative from Kentucky
Charlie Finley (1918–1996), American businessman, best known as owner of the Oakland Athletics
Chuck Finley (born 1962), American professional baseball pitcher, primarily for the then-California Angels
Charles Finley (coach) (1907–1972), American college basketball coach, primarily at the University of Idaho
Charles M. Finley (1899–1958), American businessman and politician from Philadelphia
Sam Axe, fictional character on the television series Burn Notice, whose most commonly used alias is "Charles Finley" or "Chuck Finley"

See also 
Charles Coleman Finlay (born 1964), American science fiction and fantasy author
Chuck Findley (born 1947), American musician